The 2018 Tour of Chongming Island was the twelfth staging of the Tour of Chongming Island, a women's stage race held in Shanghai, China. It ran from 26 to 28 April 2018, as the 10th event of the 2018 UCI Women's World Tour. German rider Charlotte Becker won the event ahead of Australian Shannon Malseed and Russian Anastasiia Iakovenko. Becker moved into the lead after she won stage 2 in a five-woman sprint.

Teams
Eighteen teams participated in the race. Each team had a maximum of six riders:

Race Summary

Stages

Stage 1

Stage 2

Stage 3

Classification leadership table

UCI World Tour

Attributed points

External links

References

2018 UCI Women's World Tour
2018 in Chinese sport
2018
April 2018 sports events in China